Mohamed Al-Hnaish Al-Gadi Al-Shalabi (born 22 June 1990) is a Libyan international footballer who plays for Portuguese club Santa Clara, as a defensive midfielder.

Career
After playing in Libya with Al-Ahly (Benghazi), Al-Gadi signed for Portuguese club Vitória de Setúbal in July 2015, alongside fellow countryman Hamdou Elhouni. He moved to Santa Clara in the January 2016 transfer window.

He made his international debut for Libya in 2013.

References

1990 births
Living people
Libyan footballers
Libya international footballers
Al-Ahly SC (Benghazi) players
Vitória F.C. players
C.D. Santa Clara players
Liga Portugal 2 players
Association football midfielders
Libyan expatriate footballers
Libyan expatriate sportspeople in Portugal
Expatriate footballers in Portugal
Libyan Premier League players
Libya A' international footballers
2014 African Nations Championship players